Olatunde Osunsanmi (born October 23, 1977) is an American film and television director and producer. He is known for his work on Universal's horror film The Fourth Kind and for the TNT dystopian drama Falling Skies, as well as being director or producer on several episodes of Star Trek: Discovery.

Life and career
Osunsanmi was born in the United States to parents who had immigrated from Nigeria. He graduated with a Masters of Fine Arts degree from Dodge College of Film and Media Arts. His first foray in the industry was with a short film he wrote and directed, entitled Etat. The feature explored the 1970s political climate of his parents’ native Nigeria.

He went on to direct and co-pen the low-budget horror film The Cavern, before being approached by Universal Studios to helm, produce and write the alien-invasion/horror flick The Fourth Kind. The film claims to be based on "actual case studies" occurring in Nome, Alaska in 2000, and included in the film is footage of Osunsanmi interviewing a "Dr. Abigail Tyler" at Chapman University in Orange, California. In 2013, he helmed the serial killer film Evidence, starring True Blood'''s Stephen Moyer.

He has since switched to directing episodic television, such as instalments of Under the Dome, The Last Ship, Extant, Sleepy Hollow, Minority Report, Gotham, Blindspot and Star Trek: Discovery.

More recently, Osunsanmi signed a multi-year overall deal with CBS Studios.

Falling Skies
In summer 2014, Osunsanmi directed his first hour of television with TNT's fourth season drama Falling Skies, entitled "Saturday Night Massacre". He was originally hired for only one episode, but another director was forced to depart episode 4.11, "Space Oddity", due to personal matters, and the cast and crew lobbied for Osunsanmi to return, and he did. He replaced outgoing director/co-executive producer Greg Beeman for the series' fifth and final season. He directed the final season premiere, "Find Your Warrior"; as well as episodes "Hunger Pains" and "Non-Essential Personnel". He lastly helmed the series' final episode, "Reborn".

 Gotham 
Osunsanmi is credited for directing Season 3, Episode 13 of the TV series, Gotham, titled "Mad City: Smile Like You Mean It". The episode aired on January 23, 2017.

 Star Trek: Discovery 
Osunsanmi directed Episode 4 (titled "The Butcher's Knife Cares Not for the Lamb's Cry", aired October 8, 2017), Episode 13 (titled "What's Past Is Prologue"; aired January 28, 2018),  Episode 18 (titled “Point of Light”; aired January 31, 2019), Episode 23 (titled “Such Sweet Sorrow”; aired April 11, 2019), Episode 30 (titled "That Hope Is You, Part 1"; aired October 15, 2020) and Episode 31 (titled "Far From Home"; aired October 22, 2020) of the TV series, Star Trek: Discovery''.  He also directed the Star Trek: Short Trek episode Calypso (a Star Trek Discovery inter-season short film).

Filmography

References

External links

1977 births
Living people
American film directors
American television directors
American people of Nigerian descent